Karin Scheele (born July 22, 1968 in Baden bei Wien) is an Austrian social democratic politician and was a member of the European Parliament from 1999 till 2008.  In December 2008, she entered the regional government of her native Land of Lower Austria to become secretary in charge of Health and Social Affairs.

After graduating from the Vienna University of Economics and Business Administration she held various functions in the Austrian Socialist Youth Movement, in the International Union of Socialist Youth and in the Austrian Social Democratic Party.

She has been a member of the Austrian Western Sahara society since 1994 and was a member of the Western Sahara working group of the European Parliament.

References

External links
 karinscheele.at - official website (in German)

1968 births
Living people
People from Baden bei Wien
MEPs for Austria 1999–2004
MEPs for Austria 2004–2009
Social Democratic Party of Austria MEPs
20th-century women MEPs for Austria
21st-century women MEPs for Austria